Kentucky Route 36 (KY 36) is a  state highway in Kentucky that runs from US 421 in Milton to US 460 in Frenchburg.

Route description

Major intersections

References

0036
Transportation in Bath County, Kentucky
Transportation in Bourbon County, Kentucky
Transportation in Carroll County, Kentucky
Transportation in Grant County, Kentucky
Transportation in Harrison County, Kentucky
Transportation in Menifee County, Kentucky
Transportation in Nicholas County, Kentucky
Transportation in Owen County, Kentucky
Transportation in Trimble County, Kentucky